Elona is a genus of gastropods.

Elona may also refer to:
 Elona (video game), a 2007 video game for the Windows platform
 fictional continent and setting for the video game Guild Wars Nightfall
 a minor character in The Magicians of Xanth in the Xanth fantasy series by Piers Anthony
 A continent featured in Guild Wars 2's second expansion, Guild Wars 2: Path of Fire

See also
 Ilona (disambiguation)